Becker Point is a headland on Scott Coast at the foot of Miers Valley, Denton Hills, Victoria Land. It was named by the Advisory Committee on Antarctic Names (1994) after Robert A. Becker, Vice President and Project Director (1982–90) of ITT Antarctic Services, corporate contractor to the National Science Foundation in Antarctica.

References
 

Headlands of Victoria Land
Scott Coast